Gláucia Langela (born 5 May 1954) is a Brazilian former professional tennis player.

A right-handed player from Jundiaí, Langela featured in the main draw of the 1981 Wimbledon Championships and received a first round bye, before losing her second round match to Susan Leo in three sets.

Langela still lives in Jundiaí and runs a local tennis academy.

References

External links
 
 

1954 births
Living people
Brazilian female tennis players
People from Jundiaí
Sportspeople from São Paulo (state)